The German-Luxembourg Nature Park is a cross-border nature park, which was established on 17 April 1964 by state treaty between the German state of Rhineland-Palatinate and the Grand Duchy of Luxembourg. It thus became the first cross-border nature park in Western Europe.
On the German side Naturpark Südeifel is providing services for visitors.

The park covers an area of 789 km² along the northern German-Luxembourg border, of which 432 km² are on the Rhine side and 357 km² on the Grand Duchy side. In Germany, the area of the park is identical with the South Eifel Landscape Park established in 1958, while the greater part of the Luxembourg side coincides with the Our Landscape Park.

The park covers the Our river valley separating the two countries and the low mountains of the Ardennes from the Eifel, in its southern part there is a region known as Little Luxembourg Switzerland. The attractions of the park include numerous monuments (e.g. Vianden Castle, former monastery in Echternach), villages and towns, river valleys with numerous waterfalls, mills and geological formations, forests, cultural heritage (the dancing procession in Echternach is inscribed on the UNESCO Intangible Heritage List). Within the park, 25 nature reserves and numerous other forms of nature protection have been established.

Gallery

Literature 
 Christian Humberg: Ein Riese namens Heimat – Streifzüge durch den Deutsch-Luxemburgischen Naturpark Eifelbildverlag, Daun, 2013,

See also 
 Our (river)
 Ardennes
 South Eifel
 List of nature parks in Germany

References

External links 

 Der Naturpark Südeifel, official webpage of the German part
 Deutsch-Luxemburgischer Naturpark, at deutsch-luxemburgischer-naturpark.info
 Naturpark Südeifel – Der Naturpark Südeifel… , at naturparke.de
 Our Naturpark (offizielle Website), at naturpark-our.lu
 Gewässerprojekt Ourtal ("Projekt Nat’OUR"), at projekt-natour.org

Geography of Luxembourg
Nature parks in Rhineland-Palatinate
Nature parks in Luxembourg
Eifel